N. A. Diaman (as known as Nikos Diaman, Nickolas Anthony Diaman; 1 November 1936—8 November 2020) was an American novelist, Queer activist, and photo artist. He was a pioneer within in the Gay Liberation Front (GLF), and he was gay.

Early life and education 
He was born Nikolaos Aristotle Diamantidis on November 1, 1936, in San Francisco, California, into a Greece family. His parents were both from Icaria, a Greek island in the Aegean sea. Diaman received a BA degree in 1958 from the University of Southern California, with a major in humanities.

Career 
He returned to San Francisco, and was introduced to the local poetry scene by George Stanley. Diaman became part of the Jack Spicer circle in North Beach and joined Robert Duncan's poetry workshop at the San Francisco Public Library.

After moving back to San Francisco in the fall of 1972, Diaman was the executive director of the Antares Foundation, which sponsored the San Francisco Gay Video Festival, and published Paragraph: A Quarterly of Gay Fiction.

During the early 1970s, Diaman was an early member and active in the Gay Liberation Front and the Gay Revolution Party. Diaman was also active in other Queer clubs and movements like the Radical Faeries, the Billy Club, and others. He wrote for Zygote magazine and Come Out! before co-founding Queer Blue Light, an independent video production group.

In 2000, he launched a new career as a photo-based artist. His work is in private and corporate collections in Paris, Santa Fe, San Francisco and San Miguel de Allende. He lived in San Francisco but had travelled regularly to San Miguel de Allende, Mexico; and Athens, Greece; as well as the Aegean Islands of Icaria and Samos, where his parents and grandparents were born.

Death 
He died on 8 November 2020, in Athens, Greece, after an emergency surgery. He was survived by a son, Aaron Sachowitz.

Bibliography 
Ed Dean Is Queer, was his first novel, was published in 1978. 

The Fourth Wall (1980)
Second Crossing (1982)
Reunion (1983)
Castro Street Memories (1988)
Private Nation (1997)
Following My Heart (2007)
The City (2007)
Paris Dreams (2009)
Athens Apartment (2009)

References

Further reading 
 Len Richmond and Gary Noguera, The Gay Liberation Book, Ramparts Press, 1973
 Donn Teal, The Gay Militants, Stein and Day, 1971
 Jeanne Pasle-Green and Jim Haynes, Hello, I Love You, Almonde 1975, Times Change Press 1977
 Dudley Glendinen and Adam Nagouney, Out for Good, Simon & Schuster, 1999
 Winston Leyland, Out in the Castro, Leyland Publications, 2002
 Karla Jay and Allen Young, Out of the Closets, World Publishing (1972), New York University Press (1992)
 Lewis Ellingham and Kevin Killian, Poet Be Like God, Wesleyan University Press, 1998
 David Carter, Stonewall, St. Martin's Press, 2004

External links
 Lotus Magazine List of Science Fiction
 Review of Private Nation

1936 births
Living people
University of Southern California alumni
Gay Liberation Front members
American gay writers